Nebria mathildae is a species of ground beetle in the Nebriinae subfamily that is endemic to Hebei, province of China.

References

mathildae
Beetles described in 2001
Beetles of Asia
Endemic fauna of China